Putti is a village in the Pallisa District of Uganda. Putti is inhabited largely by the Abayudaya people. The villagers of Putti are currently undergoing an Orthodox Jewish conversion to Judaism.

Community life 
Putti is an agrarian village. The community centers around the She'erit Yisra'el Synagogue, which has about 150 members. The congregation is collectively known as the Kahal Kadosh She'erit Yisra'el or KKSY (Holy Congregation Remnant of Israel).  Putti villagers currently practice Judaism according to Orthodox (Sephardi) halakha, as candidates for Orthodox conversion. Local members perform berit milah on baby boys at eight days old, keep kashrut, observe the Shabbat, the Jewish holy days and the laws of family purity Taharat haMishpacha.

The community was founded around 1920 when the Chief of the District Semei Kakungulu, angry at the (British) Christians who had betrayed him, felt an affinity for the Jews of the Old Testament.  He declared his community would now be Jewish and based their practices on what he understood from reading the Bible and meeting Jewish travelers.  After the period of harsh oppression under Idi Amin, a few of the community members visited the Synagogue in Nairobi and connected to traditional Judaism.  They began to incorporate the practices they observed into their own worship.

Eventually the worldwide Jewish community became aware of a Jewish presence in Uganda through the efforts of a young peace corp volunteer.  Reform and Conservative Jews, impressed with their desire to be Jewish offered to assist them. The majority of Jewish settlements around Mbale accepted this support, which included Jewish artifacts, financial support and non-orthodox conversion and acceptance.  However, the community in Putti, to the present day, did not go along with the rest of the Abayudaya and is holding out till the present day in the hope to receive orthodox-accepted conversion.

An interesting latest development occurred in 2012 with the possible recognition of the Putti Abayudaya by Israel and the Orthodox Jewish world, thanks to the efforts of Rabbi Shlomo Riskin, founding Chief Rabbi of Efrat and Chancellor of the Ohr Torah Stone institute, in coordination with PVAO (Putti Village Assistance Organization). A new mikveh (ritual bath) has been built and fundraising efforts are in process to finish a new synagogue. The community is governed by an elected board, currently chaired by  Tarphon Kamya. Putti village receives outside support from PVAO (Putti Village Assistance Organization).

Persecution 
During the reign of Idi Amin, a ban was placed on Judaism in Uganda. Many practitioners of Judaism converted to other religions due to the ban. Later, the community called itself 'Remnant of Israel' because as a result of Idi Amin's persecution, the entire community had almost disappeared.

External links 
 PVAO Website 
 PVAO Facebook Page 
 KKSY Facebook Page 
 Putti Youth Facebook Page 
 About the Mikveh in Putti:

References 

Jewish communities
Jewish Ugandan history
Pallisa District
Populated places in Eastern Region, Uganda